Abusir (also spelled Abousir and Abu Seer, known in ancient times as Taposiris Magna ) is a seaside town on the shore of Lake Mariout on the western extremity of Egypt's Nile delta. Ruins of an ancient temple and an ancient replica of the Lighthouse of Alexandria are to be seen here. As of 2009, it was also suspected to be the burial place of Cleopatra VII and Mark Antony.

Ancient relics
A series of tombs and the remains of a temple are found on a stony kurkar ridge, wedged between the lake and the sea.

Ancient tomb
A well-preserved ancient tomb is thought to be a scaled-down model of the Alexandria Pharos. It dates to the reign of Ptolemy II (285–246 BC), and is therefore likely to have been built at about the same time as the Alexandria Pharos.

Recent excavations
Zahi Hawass and Kathleen Martinez have excavated the vicinity of the Temple of Isis since 2006. They found a carved male head and a partial mask, showing cleft chin reminiscent of Mark Antony, besides a stash of coins bearing the image of Cleopatra VII. Relying on these and the account of Plutarch, they believed that Cleopatra and Mark Antony were both buried in the vicinity, most likely below the Temple of Isis.

See also
Abu Qir (ancient Canopus), similarly named, but east of Alexandria
Busiris of the central delta, likewise dedicated to Isis

References

External links

Cities in ancient Egypt
Ruins in Egypt
Nile Delta